The Innisfail Advocate was a newspaper published in Innisfail, Queensland, Australia.

History
Patrick James Leahy launched the Johnstone River Advocate on 6 December 1906. On Leahy's death in 1927 the newspaper was purchased by William Henry George Groom.

It was originally published as a weekly newspaper; Groom moved to a bi-weekly schedule in January 1929. From November 1940, the newspaper was published daily and in May 1941 was renamed the Evening Advocate.

In 1973 a massive increase in the cost of telex messages used to circulate syndicated news made the newspaper financially unviable and Groom threatened to close the newspaper in September 1973. However he was persuaded to continue to publish the newspaper and from October 1973 it was published only three times a week without telexed news content. Groom retired in January 1978, selling the newspaper.

In 2015, the newspaper continues to be published bi-weekly as the Innisfail Advocate by Newscorp.

Along with a number of other regional Australian newspapers owned by NewsCorp, the newspaper ceased publication in June 2020. It was deemed "unprofitable" by Newscorp.

The Innisfail Advocate will be now covered by the Cairns Post.

Digitisation 
Historic issues of the newspaper from 1928 to 1954 have been digitised as part of the Australian Newspapers Digitisation Program of the National Library of Australia and are available via Trove.

References

External links
 

Newspapers published in Queensland
1906 establishments in Australia
Innisfail, Queensland
Newspapers on Trove